English mythology is the collection of myths that have emerged throughout the history of England, sometimes being elaborated upon by successive generations, and at other times being rejected and replaced by other explanatory narratives. These narratives consist of folk traditions developed in England after the Norman Conquest, integrated with traditions from Anglo-Saxon mythology, Christian mythology, and Celtic mythology. Elements of the Matter of Britain, Welsh mythology and Cornish mythology which relate directly to England are included, such as the foundation myth of Brutus of Troy and the Arthurian legends, but these are combined with narratives from the Matter of England and traditions from English folklore.

Notable figures and legends
 Alfred the Great (849–899): In 878, burns the cakes in Athelney, Somerset before defeating the Great Heathen Army at the Battle of Edington.
 Angul (13th century): Legendary founder and king of the Angles.
 King Arthur (late 5th and early 6th centuries A.D.): Legendary leader who, according to medieval histories and romances, led the Knights of the Round Table in the defence of Britain against Saxon invaders. A central figure in the legends making up the Matter of Britain. (see also: Welsh, Cornish, and Breton mythologies)
 Athelston (mid- or late 14th century): Anonymous Middle English verse romance, often classified as a Matter of England text. Its themes of kingship, justice and the rule of law relate to the politics of Richard II's reign.
 Beowulf (dates to between the 8th and the early 11th centuries): Epic poem in Old English. The original manuscript has no title, but the story it tells has become known by the name of its protagonist. Beowulf may be the oldest surviving long poem in Old English and is commonly cited as one of the most important works of Anglo-Saxon literature.
 Sir Bevis of Hampton (dates to the first half of the 13th century): Legendary English hero; the subject of medieval metrical romances which bear his name.
 Brutus of Troy, or Brute of Troy (dates to the 9th century: Legendary descendant of the Trojan hero Aeneas, known in medieval British history as the eponymous founder and first king of Britain. Brutus first appears in the Historia Brittonum, but is best known from Geoffrey of Monmouth's Historia Regum Britanniae.
 Fulk FitzWarin (c. 1160–1258): Subject of the medieval legend Fouke le Fitz Waryn, which relates the story of Fulk's life as an outlaw and his struggle to regain his familial right to Whittington Castle from King John.
 The Tale of Gamelyn (dates to c. 1350): Romance taking place during the reign of King Edward I, telling the story of Gamelyn and the various obstacles he must overcome in order to retrieve his rightful inheritance from his older brother. Written in a dialect of Middle English and considered part of the Matter of England.
 Guy of Warwick (dates to the 13th century): Legendary English hero of Romance popular in England and France from the 13th to 17th centuries; considered to be part of the Matter of England.
 Havelok the Dane, or Lay of Havelok the Dane (between 1280 and 1290): Middle English Romance considered to be part of the Matter of England; the story derives from two earlier Anglo-Norman texts.
 Hengist and Horsa (5th century): Legendary brothers said to have led the Angles, Saxons and Jutes in their invasion of Britain in the 5th century; Horsa was killed fighting the Britons, but Hengist successfully conquered Kent, becoming the forefather of its Jutish kings. A figure named Hengest appears in the Finnesburg Fragment and in Beowulf.
 King Horn (dates to the middle of the 13th century): Chivalric romance in Middle English; considered part of the Matter of England. Believed to be the oldest extant romance in Middle English.
 Lady Godiva (dates to at least the 13th century): English noblewoman who, according to legend, rode naked – covered only in her long hair – through the streets of Coventry to gain a remission of the oppressive taxation that her husband imposed on his tenants. The term "Peeping Tom" originates from later versions of this legend, in which a man named Thomas watched her ride and was struck blind or dead.
 Robin Hood (dates to the 1370s): Heroic outlaw of English folklore who, according to legend, was a highly skilled archer and swordsman. Traditionally depicted dressed in Lincoln green, he is said to rob from the rich and give to the poor. Alongside his band of Merry Men in Sherwood Forest and against the Sheriff of Nottingham, he became a popular folk figure in the Late Middle Ages, and continues to be represented in literature, film and television.
 Sceafa (dates, arguably, to the 6th century): Ancient Lombardic king in English legend. The story has Sceafa appearing mysteriously as a child, coming out of the sea in an empty skiff. The name has historically been modernized Shava.
 Waltheof of Melrose (c. 1095 – 1159): 12th century English abbot and saint; born to the English nobility, Waltheof is noted for his severe, self-imposed austerities and kindness to the poor.
 Wayland the Smith (dates to the 8th century): Legendary master blacksmith who appears in Deor, Waldere, and Beowulf; the legend is depicted on the Franks Casket.

Legacy of English mythology in English literature
 Arthurian tales: see King Arthur.
 The Tales of Robin Hood and his Merry Men: see Robin Hood.
 The works of C.S. Lewis (1898–1963).
 The works of William Shakespeare (1564–1616).
 The works of J.R.R. Tolkien (1892–1973).

References

External links
 Alfred the Great – British Library
 Thomas Malory's Le Morte Darthur – British Library
 Beowulf – British Library
 Layamon's Roman de Brut – British Library